Faith mission is a term used most frequently among evangelical Christians to refer to a missionary organization with an approach to evangelism that encourages its missionaries to "trust in God to provide the necessary resources". These missionaries are said to "live by faith."
Most faith missionaries are not financially supported by denominations.

Faith missionaries 
Early advocates of faith missions included many Plymouth Brethren missionaries such as:
 Hudson Taylor, missionary to China, and founder of the China Inland Mission, who advocated "Moving men, by God, through prayer alone" and not soliciting funds at all.
 Anthony Norris Groves, referred to as the "father of faith missions".
 Louisa Daniell, who ran a Mission Hall in Aldershot, the first of others across the UK
 George Müller, who ran orphanages in the Bristol area of England.

Other early leaders included:
 Arthur Tappan Pierson
 Methodist Episcopal Church missionary bishop, William Taylor

Modern examples include:
 Jim Elliot, martyred missionary to the Huaorani people of Ecuador
 The missionaries of The Faith Mission and of the Two by Twos sect
 Robert Pierce,  founder of  World Vision

Faith mission organizations 
The Brethren (Jim Roberts group)
Echoes of Service
Mission Africa
OMF International (formerly China Inland Mission)
WEC International

See also 
 Henry Grattan Guinness
 Indigenous church mission theory

Notes 

Christian missions
Evangelical Christian missions